The Faculty of Dramatic Arts (abbreviated FDU) is a constituent institution of the University of Arts in Belgrade which focuses on education and research in the fields of film, theatre, dramaturgy, culture, radio, acting and medias. It was established in 1948, as the first faculty of this type in Yugoslavia.

The building, built in the brutalist style, is located in the urban neighborhood of Novi Beograd.

History 
The Faculty of Dramatic Arts was established in 1948 as the Academy of Theatre Arts.
In 1950, the High Education School for Film Acting and Directing was merged into it, and in 1962, its name was changed to the Academy of Theatre, Film, Radio and Television. In 1973, it became a faculty and acquired its current name.

Departments 

 Acting
 Dramaturgy
 Camera
 Editing
 Film and Television Directing
 Film and Television Production
 Management and Production in Theatre, Radio and Culture
 Theatre and Radio Directing
 Sound Recording and Design

Notable teachers and alumni 

Stefan Arsenijević
Miroslav Benka
Slobodan Beštić
Olga Bisera
Isidora Bjelica
Predrag Bjelac
Dragoslav Bokan
Dragan Ćirjanić
Srđan Dragojević
Bogdan Diklić
Nikola Đuričko
Bekim Fehmiu
Nebojša Glogovac
Srdan Golubović
Branislava Ilić
Zorica Jevremović
Mirjana Joković
Čedomir Jovanović
Dragan Jovanović
Olivera Katarina
Dušan Kovačević
Siniša Kovačević
Ana Lasić
Branislav Lečić
Goran Marković
Zinaid Memišević
Radoslav Milenković
Boris Miljković
Đorđe Milosavljević
Vjera Mujović
Taško Načić
Predrag Nikolić
Nataša Ninković
Nebojša Pajkić
Vesna Perić
Nikola Pejaković
Stole Popov
Miloš Radivojević
Nadja Regin
Lazar Ristovski
Seka Sablić
Uglješa Šajtinac
Slobodan Selenić
Biljana Srbljanović
Boro Stjepanović
Zoran Stefanović
Slavko Štimac
Danilo Stojković
Mihailo Lađevac
Milan Todorović
Sergej Trifunović
Mila Turajlić
Milovan Vitezović

Slobodan-Selenić-Award 
This award (Serbian: "Slobodan Selenić" za najbolju diplomsku dramu na FDU) receives a student for the best graduation work each year, usually a dramatic text, named after the well-respected faculty teacher Slobodan Selenić.
1995 Biljana Srbljanović
1999 Uglješa Šajtinac

See also 
 Education in Serbia
 List of universities in Serbia

References

External links 
 

Education in Belgrade
Arts
University of Arts in Belgrade
Arts organizations based in Serbia
New Belgrade